The odd-striped ctenotus (Ctenotus impar)  is a species of skink found in Western Australia. It was first described by Australian biologist Glen Milton Storr in 1969.

References

impar
Reptiles described in 1969
Taxa named by Glen Milton Storr